Helenus, Elenus, or Helenos (Ἕλενος) is a Greek name carried by various people:

 Helenus in Greek mythology, a Trojan soldier and prophet mentioned in the Iliad
 Helenus of Alexandria (painter), an ancient Greek painter 
 Helenus of Alexandria (Cilicia), a bishop of Alexandria Scabiosa in Cilicia

 Helenus of Heliopolis, a bishop of Heliopolis in Egypt
 Helenus of Tarsus, 3rd century, a bishop of Tarsus in Cilicia